6-Isopropyl-6-nor-lysergic acid diethylamide (IP-LAD) is an analog of lysergic acid diethylamide (LSD) developed by the team of David E. Nichols. In studies on mice, it was found to be approximately 40% the potency of LSD, compared to the 60% increase in potency seen with ETH-LAD and roughly equivalent potency in AL-LAD and PRO-LAD.

References 
 

Psychedelic drugs
Lysergamides
Serotonin receptor agonists